Kerry Anne Ehrin (born October 8, 1960) is an American screenwriter, showrunner, and producer. In 1990, she was nominated for the Primetime Emmy Award for Outstanding Comedy Series for her work as a producer on the ABC comedy-drama series The Wonder Years. In 2011, she was nominated for the Primetime Emmy Award for Outstanding Drama Series for her work as a producer on the NBC drama series Friday Night Lights. From 2013 to 2017, she was also showrunner and co-creator of the critically acclaimed  A&E drama series Bates Motel. Ehrin then developed and served as showrunner on the Apple TV+ series The Morning Show on the first and second seasons.  She is now a consultant on the third season while continuing to develop new series for Apple TV+ under her overall deal.

Personal life
Ehrin was born in Los Angeles, California, and grew up in the Woodland Hills neighborhood with her sister, Mary. She was educated at Agoura High School, from which she graduated in 1978. Ehrin studied literature, specializing in playwriting, at the University of California, Los Angeles, and wrote her thesis on the work of Lewis Carroll.

She resides in Hidden Hills, California, with her three children, daughter Shane and twin sons Alex and Nicky. The children's father is Mr. Wrong co-writer, Craig Munson.

Career

Beginnings (1989–2005)
In 1989, Ehrin began her career as a writer and co-producer on the ABC comedy-drama mystery series Moonlighting and the ABC comedy-drama series The Wonder Years. For the latter, she was nominated for the Primetime Emmy Award for Outstanding Comedy Series in 1990. She next served as a consulting producer and writer on the Fox drama series Boston Public from 2003 to 2004, and on the ABC legal drama series Boston Legal from 2004 to 2005.

Ehrin also co-wrote the screenplays of the 1996 comedy film Mr. Wrong and the 1999 action adventure film Inspector Gadget.

Friday Night Lights (2006–2011)
Ehrin was nominated for the Writers Guild of America Award for Television: New Series at the 2007 ceremony, for her work as a consulting producer and writer on the first season of Friday Night Lights. She was subsequently nominated for the Writers Guild of America Award for Television: Dramatic Series for three consecutive years: at the 2008 ceremony, the 2009 ceremony, and at the 2010 ceremony. She was also nominated for the Primetime Emmy Award for Outstanding Drama Series in 2011.

Parenthood (2011–2012)
From 2011 to 2012, Ehrin served as a co-executive producer and writer on the NBC drama series Parenthood.

Bates Motel (2013–2017)
Ehrin, alongside Carlton Cuse and Anthony Cipriano, developed the Psycho contemporary prequel series Bates Motel for the American cable network A&E. The series began airing in March 2013 and concluded its run in April 2017. Ehrin served as showrunner, lead writer, and an executive producer for the series. In 2014, she was nominated for Best Drama Series Produced by a Woman at the Women's Image Network Awards for her work on the series.

The Morning Show (2019-2022) 
In November 2017, Apple ordered two seasons of the comedy-drama series The Morning Show, which stars Jennifer Aniston and Reese Witherspoon. Ehrin served as showrunner and executive producer alongside Aniston, Witherspoon, Michael Ellenberg, Mimi Leder, Lauren Levy Neustadter and Kristin Hahn. Ehrin also signed a multi-year deal with Apple to produce original content.

Filmography

Awards and nominations

References

External links
 

1960 births
American film producers
American women television producers
American television writers
American women screenwriters
Film producers from California
Living people
People from Agoura Hills, California
Television producers from California
University of California, Los Angeles alumni
Writers from Los Angeles
Screenwriters from California
American women film producers
American women television writers
21st-century American women